École secondaire de Clare is a French high school located in Meteghan River, Digby County in the Canadian province of Nova Scotia, for Acadian students. As of September 2012, the school comprises grades 7 to 12. The school is in the Conseil scolaire acadien provincial school board.

External links
École secondaire de Clare school website

High schools in Nova Scotia
Schools in Digby County, Nova Scotia